Ján Mikolaj (born 19 October 1953) is a Slovak politician, a member of Slovak National Party and the Slovak Education Minister from 2006 to 2010. Formerly he was a member of Mečiar's Movement for a Democratic Slovakia. After the demission of Igor Štefanov, Mikolaj was also Minister for Construction and Regional Development.

References

External links 
 Ján Mikolaj on the government homepage.

1953 births
Living people
Politicians from Košice
People's Party – Movement for a Democratic Slovakia politicians
Slovak National Party politicians
Members of the National Council (Slovakia) 2002-2006
Members of the National Council (Slovakia) 2010-2012